KUVI-DT (channel 45) is a television station in Bakersfield, California, United States, affiliated with the digital multicast network Twist. It is owned by TelevisaUnivision alongside two Class A stations: Univision owned-and-operated station KABE-CD, channel 39, and UniMás owned-and-operated station KBTF-CD, channel 31 (both of which are simulcast in high definition on KUVI's respective second and third digital subchannels). The three stations share studios on Truxtun Avenue in the western section of Bakersfield; KUVI's transmitter is located atop Mount Adelaide. From 1998–2004 and again from 2014–2017, it was the only Univision-owned station for which the main channel broadcasts in English.

History
The station first went on the air on December 18, 1988 as KDOB-TV. It was originally owned by Dorothy Owens. It first operated from studios located on North Chester Avenue in Bakersfield. Dorothy would later sold the station to her brother Buck (1929–2006) in 1990. and would change its call letters to KUZZ-TV on March 18, 1991. The station later moved its operations to a new studio facility located on Sillect Avenue in Bakersfield. The station became a charter affiliate of UPN on January 16, 1995, and remained with that network for its entire existence. On October 17, 1997, the station once again changed its call letters, this time to KUVI. Buck Owens sold the station to current owner Univision in 1998. One last change to the call letters during the analog era came on January 1, 2004, the station chose to add the "-TV" suffix to the letters, hence the current callsign KUVI-TV. With the digital transition completed, the station replaced the "-TV" suffix with the "-DT" duffix on June 23, 2009 (all Univision-owned full-service television stations, regardless of whether or not they had a suffix after their call signs prior to the transition, now have a "-DT" suffix as part of their legal call signs).

KUVI at first was tentatively awaiting to affiliate with The CW Television Network , but instead it was announced on June 15, 2006 that it would affiliate with MyNetworkTV, despite the fact that owner Univision was sold to a group led by children's television mogul Haim Saban (founder of Saban Entertainment and former co-owner of Fox Family Channel with News Corporation before it became Disney-owned ABC Family Channel). Providence Equity Partners, one of the private equity firms which are part of the Saban-led consortium, acquired a 19 percent stake in Univision at that time.

The CW affiliation ended up on KWFB, now officially called KGET-DT2, as of September 18, 2006.

On April 20, 2007, Clear Channel entered into an agreement to sell its entire television stations group (which included KGET) to Newport Television, a broadcasting holding company controlled by Providence Equity Partners. However, with only four full-power stations, Bakersfield does not have enough to legally support a co-owned duopoly operation. As a result, the Federal Communications Commission granted conditional approval of the deal, provided that Providence Equity Partners divest either KGET or its stake in Univision as soon as the sale was finalized. That occurred on March 14, 2008. KGET was divested by Newport Television to High Plains Broadcasting; however, Newport continued to manage that station through a shared services agreement (SSA) until it was sold to its current owner Nexstar Broadcasting Group in February 2013.

On September 11, 2017, KUVI-DT became an affiliate of the Justice Network (now True Crime Network).

On January 3, 2022, it switched affiliations from True Crime Network to Twist.

Technical information

Subchannels
The station's digital signal is multiplexed:

Analog-to-digital conversion
KUVI-TV discontinued regular programming on its analog signal, over UHF channel 45, on June 12, 2009, the official date in which full-power television stations in the United States transitioned from analog to digital broadcasts under federal mandate. The station's digital signal relocated from its pre-transition UHF channel 55, which was among the high band UHF channels (52-69) that were removed from broadcasting use as a result of the transition, to its analog-era UHF channel 45.

See also
Buck Owens (1929–2006)

References

External links

Twist (TV network) affiliates
UVI-DT
Television channels and stations established in 1988
1988 establishments in California
Quest (American TV network) affiliates
Court TV affiliates